Sulfaphenazole (or sulfafenazol) is a sulfonamide antibacterial.

References 

CYP2D6 inhibitors
Sulfonamide antibiotics
Pyrazoles